Danielle Marie McCormack (born 18 September 1983) is an English actress and singer/songwriter and musician.

McCormack is best known for playing Mel Barker on the TV show My Parents Are Aliens on CITV between 1999 and 2004, leaving after series 6 for a career in the music industry. She did however appear in the 2005 link episode "Thanks for All the Earthworm Custard", the last episode of series 7.

McCormack was born in Yorkshire. She is also an accomplished singer/songwriter and has also written a number of tracks with Geordie Walker of Killing Joke which were released online.

Filmography

Theatre
Oliver at the London Palladium (1996)
Beauty and the Beast (2011)
Cinderella (2009)
Jack (2014)

References

External links

English television actresses
English film actresses
Living people
1983 births
20th-century English actresses
21st-century English actresses
English stage actresses
Actresses from Yorkshire